Claveau tram stop is located on line B of the Tramway de Bordeaux. The stop is located on Rue Joseph Brunet in the city of Bordeaux and is operated by Transports Bordeaux Métropole.

For most of the day on Mondays to Fridays, trams run at least every five minutes between central Bordeaux and Claveau, with alternate trams continuing to Berges de la Garonne. Services run less frequently in the early morning, late evenings, weekends and public holidays.

The tram stop has two tracks, as does the line to the south, and the stop is served by two side platforms. Immediately to the north of the stop, there is a turnback siding and the line becomes single track and continues as such to the terminus at the next stop, Berges de la Garonne.

Close by 
 Piscine Georges Tissot
 Centre d'animation

References 

Bordeaux tramway stops
Tram stops in Bordeaux
Railway stations in France opened in 2008